Ayerza is an Argentine surname shared by several notable people, among them being:
 Abel Ayerza (1861–1918), Argentine doctor who gave his name to the cardiological condition Ayerza syndrome
  (1860-1901), Argentine photographer
  (1879-1936), Argentinian sculptor
 Josefina Ayerza (b. before 1970), Argentine writer and psychoanalyst living in the United States
 Marcos Ayerza (b. 1983), Argentine rugby player
 Toribio Ayerza (1815–1884), Argentine physician

See also
 Ayerza syndrome - Medical condition named for Abel Ayerza
 Cotesia ayerza - species of wasp
  - Train station in Argentina